Eggesin is a municipality in the Vorpommern-Greifswald district, in Mecklenburg-Western Pomerania, Germany. It is situated on the river Uecker, 7 km southeast of Ueckermünde, and 42 km northwest of Szczecin.

Transport

 Eggesin railway station is served by local services to Neubrandenburg, Pasewalk and Ueckermünde.

Towns near Eggesin
 Szczecin (Poland)
 Ueckermünde (Germany)
 Pasewalk (Germany)
 Strasburg, Germany
 Nowe Warpno (Poland)
 Police (Poland)

Personalities

 Ludwig von Schröder (1854–1933), Prussian admiral
 Egbert Swensson (born 1956), sail sportsman

References

Vorpommern-Greifswald
1216 establishments in Europe
Populated places established in the 13th century